The 48th Operations Group (48 OG) is the flying component of the 48th Fighter Wing, assigned to the United States Air Forces in Europe – Air Forces Africa. The group is stationed at RAF Lakenheath, England.

Assigned Units
The 48th Operations Group (Tail Code: LN) consists of four flying squadrons of F-15C/D/E and F-35A aircraft capable of accomplishing fighter operations worldwide and one operations support squadron.

 48th Operations Support Squadron
The 48th Operations Support Squadron, “Eagles”, provides the operational foundation for three squadrons of F-15C/D/Es, capable of providing fighter operations in support of war plans and contingency operations for USEUCOM, USAFRICOM, and NATO. Support provided by the 48th OSS includes flight and airfield management, air traffic control, weather, intelligence, weapons and tactics, scheduling, training, life support, operational plans and group administration.

 492nd Fighter Squadron The 492nd Fighter Squadron, nicknamed the Madhatters and the Bolars, employs the F-15E Strike Eagle and is capable of executing strategic attack, interdiction, and counter air missions in support of USAFE, USEUCOM and NATO operations. Employs the full array of air superiority and surface attack munitions to include the most advanced precision-guided weapons in the USAF inventory. Capable of deploying to any theater of operations in the world.
 493rd Fighter Squadron  The 493rd Fighter Squadron, nicknamed the Grim Reapers, was the only F-15C/D Eagle fighter squadron assigned to USAFE. The 493rd FS is capable of executing air superiority and air defense missions in support of USAFE, USEUCOM and NATO war plans and contingency operations. Employs the world's finest air-to-air weapons and electronic identification systems. Maintains the ability to rapidly generate, deploy, and sustain operations to execute wartime and peacetime tasking in any theater of operations in the world. The unit has flown the F-15C Eagles at Lakenheath since 1994 and has convert to the F-35A as of April 2022.
 494th Fighter Squadron  The 494th Fighter Squadron, nicknamed the Panthers, also employs the F-15E Strike Eagle and is capable of executing strategic attack, interdiction, and counter air missions in support of USAFE, USEUCOM and NATO war plans and contingency operations. Employs the full array of air superiority and surface attack munitions to include the most advanced precision-guided weapons in the USAF inventory. Capable of deploying to any theater of operations in the world.
 495th Fighter Squadron  The 495th Fighter Squadron, nicknamed the Valkyries, is the USAF's first overseas F-35A Lightning II squadron. It was reactivated on 1 October 2021 and will eventually operate 24 F-35As.

History
 For additional history and lineage, see 48th Fighter Wing

World War II

On 15 January 1941, the United States Army Air Corps activated the 48th Bombardment Group (Light) at Hunter Field, Savannah, Georgia. On the same date, the Air Corps assigned the group's operational units: the 55th, 56th, and 57th Bombardment Squadrons (Light) and the 9th Reconnaissance Squadron (Light). These activations resulted from the buildup of military forces known as the "First Aviation Objective," in which the Air Corps activated 54 combat groups to prepare for the looming Second World War.

Initially the 48th and its four flying squadrons served as a training unit, preparing its pilots and maintenance crews for eventual combat. After training, many of the group's members went on to serve in squadrons stationed in Europe and the Pacific, while the 48th remained in the states. Over the next two years the group moved from Hunter Field to Will Rogers Field, Oklahoma, back to Savannah, Georgia, then on to Key Field, Mississippi; William Northern Field, Tennessee; and Walterboro Army Airfield, South Carolina. Initially the men of the 48th trained with A-20 and A-18 twin-engine attack, light bombers. After moving to Key Field, the group used A-24, A-31, A-35, and A-36 aircraft for training.

While at Key Field, on 15 August 1943, the group was redesignated the 48th Fighter-Bomber Group. The flying squadrons were redesignated the 492d, 493d, 494th, and 495th Fighter-Bomber Squadrons. Five days after these organizational changes, the 48th moved again, this time back to William Northern Field, Tennessee. With this move, the 48th abandoned its training mission and served strictly as an operational unit, flying in maneuvers with its first fighters, the P-39 Airacobra and P-40 Warhawk.

In early 1944, after years of training and flying across the US, the 48th returned to the East Coast. At first the group conducted coastal patrol missions and training in the single-seat fighter it would use throughout World War II, the P-47 Thunderbolt. After three months in South Carolina, the group moved up to Camp Shanks, New York and prepared for its embarkation to Europe. After a week of sea travel, the contingent arrived at Gourock, Scotland. From there they traveled by train for two days to their first overseas base, RAF Ibsley in Southern England, and were assigned to the Ninth Air Force.

The 48th flew the Republic P-47 Thunderbolt and had the following fighter squadrons and fuselage codes:
 492d Fighter Squadron (F4)
 493d Fighter Squadron (I7)
 494th Fighter Squadron (6M)

Almost immediately after their arrival, members of the 48th began a rigorous training program, flying dive-bombing, glide bombing, night flying, low-level navigation, smoke laying, reconnaissance, and patrol convoy sorties. Over the next two months, the number of sorties steadily increased and the group flew its first combat missions on 20 April 1944—an uneventful fighter sweep of the occupied French coast. The group and squadrons underwent another name change on 30 May 1944, dropping the designation "bomber." Thus, the names that would remain with the units until their inactivation were the 48th Fighter Group and the 492d, 493d, and 494th Fighter Squadrons.

Unknown at the time to the pilots of the 48th, all of their training was specifically designed for a campaign against the German positions in Normandy. On 6 June 1944, the 48th participated in a massive invasion of France, which included more than 14,000 sorties flown by the allied air forces. The three squadrons assisted the Normandy invasion by dropping bombs on bridges and gun positions, attacking rail lines and trains, and providing visual reconnaissance reports. Over the course of the Normandy campaign, the 48th flew nearly 2,000 sorties, dropping nearly 500 tons of bombs and fired more than 160,000 rounds of ammunition

With the pocket in Northern France secured, the group quickly moved into the recently conquered territory. On 18 June, the 48th moved its operations, along with the 492d and 493d Fighter Squadrons to Deux Jumeaux Airfield (A-4), France. The 494th Fighter Squadron followed on 4 July. From Deux Jumeaux, the 48th began a mission it would continue throughout the war: providing support for the United States First Army.

In late July 1944, attacks from the air helped the First Army break through the German positions at Saint-Lô, France. In saturation attacks, the 48th struck tanks, convoys, gun positions, and ammunition dumps as the allied ground forces pushed the German army back. Keeping up with the front lines, the 48th was constantly on the move. It arrived at Villacoublay Airfield (A-42), France, on 29 August, Cambrai/Niergnies Airfield (A-47), France, on 15 September, and Sint-Truiden Airfield (A-92), Belgium, on 30 September. The 48th twice received the honor of being mentioned in Belgium's "Order of the Day" and assisted in the attack of German positions in the Netherlands.

One of the 48th's most memorable attacks took place on 6 December 1944. Despite difficult weather and heavy enemy fire, the 48th's pilots struck German buildings and troop concentrations in Jülich, Germany, allowing ground forces to advance into the sector and earning the 48th a Distinguished Unit Citation.

Two weeks later, the group was called on to hold back a massive German assault in the "Battle of the Bulge." The 48th flew under heavy weather with its allies as the German military committed its forces in an all-out assault. Often flying as low as 20 feet off the ground, the men of the 48th strafed ground positions, holding back the Nazi armies in their last major offensive. The Commanding Officer during this period was Col. S. Paul Latiolais.

By 1945 the allies had gained nearly complete air superiority, allowing the 48th to conduct its missions at will. As the front line moved eastward, so did the 48th Fighter Group: moving into Kelz Airfield (Y-32), Germany, on 26 March; Kassel-Rothwesten Airfield (R-12), Germany, on 17 April; and Illesheim Airfield (R-10), Germany, on 29 April.

Within a week of the group arriving at Illesheim, the allied nations celebrated Victory in Europe Day. Finally, on 8 May 1945, the 48th flew its final mission from Illesheim. Captain Troy Smith observed the ground situation: "They were in retreat by the tens of thousands. They were walking on one side of the road, guns slung over their shoulders, and our guys were on the other side of the road in convoys going the other way. At that point, I knew it was really over."

A month after the war ended, the 48th retraced its steps as it headed toward home. On 5 July 1945, the group arrived in Laon, France. After a few weeks back in France the group received orders to return to the US. With many of the group's members separating at port, those remaining set up the group headquarters at Seymour Johnson Field, North Carolina and was programmed for deployment to Okinawa to take part in planned Invasion of Japan. Training discontinued after Atomic bombings of Hiroshima and Nagasaki and the sudden end of the Pacific War.

Two months later on 7 November 1945, the 48th Fighter Group and its flying squadrons inactivated as part of the massive postwar draw down.

Cold War

On 10 July 1952 the United States Air Force reactivated the group as the 48th Fighter-Bomber Group at Chaumont Air Base, where it assumed the mission, personnel and 58 Republic F-84G Thunderjets of the federalized Oklahoma Air National Guard 137th Fighter-Bomber Group, which was simultaneously inactivated and returned to state control.  Similarly, the group's 492d, 493d and 494th Fighter-Bomber Squadrons replaced the 125th, 127th and 128th Squadrons of the 137th Group. The group and supporting units were assigned to the 48th Fighter-Bomber Wing under the wing base organization plan.

The few National Guardsmen still with the wing departed and the last were released from active duty on 9 July, although a few reserve officers remained on active duty for an additional six to twelve months.

Chaumont Air Base was still largely under construction at the time of the activation of the 48th FBG and living and working conditions were primitive. The men were billeted in tents that were heated by pot-bellied stoves; all of the roads on the base were yet unpaved and were basically mud ruts through the turf. The only hardened facilities were a concrete runway and a handful of tarpaper shacks. Within two years, the wing headed up an engineering project that resulted in the construction of permanent barracks, a wing headquarters, flightline shops, and warehouses

With the F-84, the 48 FBG supported NATO and the United States Air Forces in Europe (USAFE), activities, participating in exercises with the US Seventh Army. With the F-84, the wing supported the North Atlantic Treaty Organization (NATO) and United States Air Forces in Europe (USAFE), and participated in exercises with the Seventh United States Army. In addition, the wing conducted operational readiness exercises and tactical evaluations. The 48th frequently deployed to Wheelus Air Base, Libya, for training in bombing and gunnery skills.

In September 1953, the 48th FBG had become so proficient with the F-84 that it assumed the role of the "" aerial demonstration team in Europe from the 86th Fighter-Bomber Group and commenced flying air shows throughout Western Europe. They would continue with their F-84Gs until the spring of 1954 when the Group's Tunderjets were replaced by F-86F Sabres.

In late 1956, the Liberty Wing became USAFE's first unit to convert to the F-100 Super Sabre. However, at this time the Chaumont runway was closed for repair, which resulted in the wing deploying to Berrechid Airfield, Morocco (near Casablanca), to train with its new aircraft.

The group was inactivated on 8 December 1957 when its component squadrons were assigned directly to the 48th Fighter-Bomber Wing as the Air Force reorganized its wings into the tri-deputate system.

1990s and twenty-first century 

On 31 March 1992, the 48th Operations Group was activated as a result of the 48th Tactical Fighter Wing implementing the USAF objective wing organization. Upon activation, the 48th OG was bestowed the lineage and history of the 48th Fighter-Bomber Group and its predecessor organizations. The 48th OG was assigned the Fighter Squadrons previously assigned to the 48th Fighter Wing upon activation, all equipped with the General Dynamics F-111F. it phased out the F-111 aircraft and was equipped with F-15 aircraft, at first 2 squadrons of "E" model Strike Eagles and then later adding a full squadron of "C" & "D" model Eagles.

Lakenheath began to receive its first McDonnell Douglas F-15E Strike Eagles in 1992. With the departure of the F-111s, the 495th Fighter Squadron was inactivated on 13 December 1991. On 18 December 1992 the last F-111F departed the base. Along with the departure of the F-111F's, the 493d Fighter Squadron was also inactivated.

With the pending closure of Bitburg Air Base Germany on 25 February 1994 it was decided to reactivate the 493d as an F-15C/D squadron. Aircraft were transferred from Eglin AFB Florida and the 493d was reactivated on 1 January. The 493rd's arrival meant that the 48th became the largest F-15E/F-15C composite unit in the U.S. Air Force.

In August 1998 an F-15D (Serial 86–182) of the 493d Fighter Squadron paid a visit to Chaumont-Semoutiers Air Base (now called Quartier General d'Aboville), France for an open house static display. This was the first time a Statue of Liberty Wing aircraft was at its original air base in almost 40 years.

Balkan/Middle East Deployments

With its new weapon systems, the group began a hectic pace of deployments that would keep at least one squadron constantly deployed for nearly six years.

On 5 August 1993, the 492d Fighter Squadron conducted the wing's first F-15E deployment when it went to Incirlik Air Base, Turkey, under Operation PROVIDE COMFORT (succeeded by NORTHERN WATCH). Thirteen days after the 492d's arrival in Turkey, Iraq violated the exclusion zone by placing surface-to-air missiles outside of the city of Mosul. In spite of repeated warnings to remove the missiles, Iraqi forces failed to comply. On the afternoon of 18 August, Liberty Wing F-15Es struck the site, eliminating the missile threat.

For the remainder of the decade, the 492d and 494th continually rotated to Turkey and to Aviano Air Base, Italy, for participation in Operation DENY FLIGHT, supporting operations in the Balkans. Providing combat air patrol with F-15Cs, the 493d also rotated planes to Turkey and Italy. This series of deployments continued into the spring of 1999.

In February 1999, while the wing served another rotation in Turkey, acts of aggression by Serbia—the core of the Federal Republic of Yugoslavia—against its Albanian population in the province of Kosovo resulted in NATO intervention, culminating in Operation ALLIED FORCE.3 Strikes against Serbian targets began on 24 March 1999.

Within 72 hours, the 493d Expeditionary Fighter Squadron, stationed at Cervia Air Base, Italy, recorded four aerial victories over Serbian Mikoyan MiG-29s. The 492 and 494 FS flew combat mission from RAF Lakenheath and Aviono AB, Italy, respectively, and employed all the AGM-130 against Serbian Air Defenses. At the same time, the 494th Expeditionary Fighter Squadron, operating from Aviano Air Base, employed its precision guided munitions—including the first combat use of a GBU-28 Bunker Buster by an Air Force F-15E. Starting in May, the 492d Expeditionary Fighter Squadron launched combat operations directly from RAF Lakenheath, the first sustained combat operations flown from England since World War II.

During the air war over Serbia, the wing deployed 1,011 personnel to 18 different locations. The group's pilots and aircraft flew combat missions from three locations, using 69 aircraft. Those remaining at RAF Lakenheath not only made up for the work of those deployed, but also launched combat missions. Furthermore, they served as a supply point for their deployed counterparts, sending 3,871 tons of equipment to various locations. In all, the pilots of the 48th serving under expeditionary squadrons flew 2,562 sorties for more than 11,000 combat hours in less than three months, dropping approximately 3 million pounds of munitions and scoring four out of five confirmed Air Force aerial victories.

After ALLIED FORCE, the 48th was given a chance to reconstitute its forces for the first time in six years. During this period, the wing upgraded its F-15E fleet with new Block E-210 models. At the same time, the wing participated in training with its NATO allies through a series of deployments across continental Europe while receiving USAFE and NATO strike evaluations, tactical evaluations, and surety inspections. Yet the wing continued to prepare for future taskings, such as its Air Expeditionary Force (AEF) commitments.

For the first time since the Gulf War, in December 2000, the 48th's flying squadrons began deploying to the desert of Southwest Asia. As part of AEFs 2 and 4 respectively, the 494th and 492d Fighter Squadrons served as Operation SOUTHERN WATCH's precision guided munitions squadrons based at Ahmed Al Jabar Air Base, Kuwait. The units employed several munitions against Iraqi targets, racking up 690 sorties for 1,229 hours for the 494th in AEF 2 and 730 sorties for 1,173.9 hours for the 492d in AEF 4.

The 48th served as the lead wing force provider for the 363d Air Expeditionary Wing at Prince Sultan Air Base, Saudi Arabia, during AEF 4. The 493d also deployed to Prince Sultan and served as SOUTHERN WATCH's air superiority squadron, flying 893 sorties for 2,201.9 hours.

Global War on Terrorism
After the AEF 4 redeployment in June 2001, the 48th moved into its 10-month training period consisting of exercises and inspections, both at home and at events such as Weapons Training Deployments. However, this period was severely interrupted by 11 September 2001.

In response, President George W. Bush initiated Operation ENDURING FREEDOM—air and ground strikes against terrorist organizations and training camps in Afghanistan. "Great harm has been done to us. We have suffered great loss. And in our grief and anger we have found our mission and our moment. Freedom and fear are at war," stated President Bush.

As part of this operation, the 492d and 493d Fighter Squadrons deployed to support the humanitarian airlift operations from Ramstein Air Base, Germany. The F-15C and F-15E squadrons ensured air superiority and supremacy for C-17 aircraft delivering humanitarian daily rations to Afghan refugees in Afghanistan.

On 21 March 2003, Operation IRAQI FREEDOM began with airstrikes and ground attacks against the Iraqi military. Nearly 500 people from the Liberty Wing served in various roles and locations.

Since that time, the 48th OG has deployed to support Air Expeditionary Force commitments in Southwest Asia.

In late 2006, the 48th expanded its mission by adding the 56th Rescue Squadron and its five Sikorsky HH-60G Pave Hawk helicopters. The 56 RQS moved to RAF Lakenheath from NAS Keflavik, Iceland.

Lineage
 Established as 48th Bombardment Group (Light) on 20 November 1940
 Activated on 15 January 1941
 Redesignated: 48th Bombardment Group (Dive) on 28 August 1942
 Redesignated: 48th Fighter-Bomber Group on 15 August 1943
 Redesignated: 48th Fighter Group on 30 May 1944
 Inactivated on 7 November 1945
 Redesignated 48th Fighter-Bomber Group on 25 June 1952
 Activated on 10 July 1952
 Inactivated on 8 December 1957
 Redesignated: 48th Tactical Fighter Group on 31 July 1985 (Remained inactive)
 Redesignated: 48th Operations Group on 1 March 1992
 Activated on 31 March 1992

Assignments

 15th Bombardment Wing, 15 January 1941
 II Air Support (later, II Ground Air Support) Command, 1 September 1941
 XII Bomber Command, 2 May 1942
 III Bomber Command, 8 May 1942
 III Ground Air Support (later, III Air Support) Command, 10 August 1942
 III Fighter Command, 6 August 1943
 Attached to I Air Support Command for operational control, 10 September 1943 – 14 January 1944

 IX Air Support (later, IX Tactical Air) Command, 31 March 1944
 XIX Tactical Air Command, 28 April 1945 – August 1945
 First Air Force, 9 September 1945 – 7 November 1945
 48th Fighter-Bomber Wing, 10 July 1952 – 8 December 1957
 48th Fighter Wing, 31 March 1992 – present

Components
 55th Bombardment (later, 492d Fighter-Bomber, 492d Fighter) Squadron (F4): : 15 January 1941 – 20 August 1943, 20 August 1943 – November 1945; 10 July 1952 – 8 December 1957; 31 March 1992 – present
 56th Bombardment (later, 493d Fighter-Bomber, 493d Fighter) Squadron (I7): 15 January 1941 – 20 August 1943, 20 August 1943 – November 1945; 10 July 1952 – 8 December 1957; 1 January 1994 – present
 56th Rescue Squadron: 28 June 2006 – 15 May 2018
 57th Rescue Squadron: 18 February 2015 – 15 May 2018
 57th Bombardment (later, 494th Fighter-Bomber, 494th Fighter) Squadron (6M): : 15 January 1941 – 20 August 1943, 20 August 1943 – November 1945; 10 July 1952 – 8 December 1957; 31 March 1992 – present
 88th Bombardment (later, 495th Fighter-Bomber, 495th Fighter) Squadron: 21 August 1941 – 10 August 1943, 10 August 1943 – 1 March 1944; 1 October 2021 – present

Stations

 Hunter Army Airfield, Georgia, 15 January 1941
 Will Rogers Field, Oklahoma, 26 May 1941
 Hunter Army Airfield, Georgia, 7 February 1942
 Key Field, Mississippi, 28 June 1942
 William Northern AAF, Tennessee, 20 August 1943
 Walterboro Army Airfield, South Carolina, 27 January – 13 March 1944
 RAF Ibsley (AAF-347), England, 31 March 1944
 Deux Jumeaux Airfield (A-4), France, 18 June 1944
 Villacoublay Airfield (A-42), France, 29 August 1944

 Cambrai/Niergnies Airfield (A-74), France, 15 September 1944
 Sint-Truiden Airfield (A-92), Belgium, 30 September 1944
 Kelz Airfield (Y-54), Germany, 26 March 1945
 Kassel-Rothwestern Airfield (R-12), Germany, 17 April 1945
 Illesheim Airfield (R-10), Germany, 29 April 1945
 Laon, France (Ground Echelon), 5 July 1945 – August 1945
 Seymour Johnson Field, North Carolina, 9 September 1945 – 7 November 1945
 Chaumont-Semoutiers Air Base, France, 10 July 1952 – 8 December 1957
 RAF Lakenheath, England, 31 March 1992 – present

Aircraft assigned

 Douglas A-20 Havoc, 1941–1944
 Douglas A-24 Banshee, 1941–1944
 Vultee A-35 Vengeance, 1941–1944
 Douglas B-18 Bolo, 1941–1944
 Bell P-39 Airacobra, 1941–1944
 Curtiss P-40 Warhawk, 1941–1944
 Vultee A-31 Vengeance, 1941–1944
 North American A-36 Apache, 1941–1944

 Republic P-47 Thunderbolt, 1944–1945
 Republic F-84G Thunderjet, 1952–1953
 North American F-86F Sabre, 1954–1957
 General Dynamics F-111F Aardvark, 1992
 McDonnell Douglas F-15E Strike Eagle, 1992–present
 McDonnell Douglas F-15C/D Eagle, 1994–present
 Sikorsky HH-60G Pave Hawk, 2004–2018
 Lockheed Martin F-35A Lightning II, 2021–present

References

 Maurer, Maurer (1983). Air Force Combat Units of World War II. Maxwell AFB, Alabama: Office of Air Force History. .
 Ravenstein, Charles A. (1984). Air Force Combat Wings Lineage and Honors Histories 1947–1977. Maxwell AFB, Alabama: Office of Air Force History. .
 USAF 48th Operations Group Factsheet
 Freeman, Roger A. (1994) UK Airfields of the Ninth: Then and Now. After the Battle 
 McAuliffe, Jerome J (2005) U.S. Air Force in France 1950–1967, Chapter 9, Chaumont-Semoutiers Air Base.
 Rogers, Brian (2005). United States Air Force Unit Designations Since 1978. Hinkley, England: Midland Publications. .
 Johnson, David C. (1988), U.S. Army Air Forces Continental Airfields (ETO), D-Day to V-E Day; Research Division, USAF Historical Research Center, Maxwell AFB, Alabama.

048